Dasea may refer to:
Dasea, endonym of Tucano language
Dasea (Arcadia), a town of ancient Arcadia, Greece